The Civilian Response Corps (sometimes referred to as CRC) is a program of the United States Department of State, Office of the Coordinator for Reconstruction and Stabilization (S/CRS).  The Civilian Response Corps is currently a group of federal employees and volunteers from the private sector, state and local governments who are trained to deploy rapidly in countries that are in crisis or emerging from conflict in order to provide reconstruction and stabilization assistance. The group includes diplomats, development specialists, public health officials, law enforcement, corrections officers, engineers, economists, lawyers, public administrators, agronomists and others – offering the full range of skills needed to help fragile states in order to restore the stability and rule of law to achieve economic recovery and sustainable growth.

The assistance was partly humanitarian, and partly to prevent failed states from becoming "havens" for terrorist groups or otherwise the possibility of a threat to the security of the United States. Originally proposed by Senators Richard Lugar (R-Ind.) and Joseph Biden (D-Del.), the Civilian Response Corps was responsible for the U.S. government efforts to stabilize war-torn societies and rebuild nations. 

The challenges of the 21st century require a significant increase in the capacity to respond quickly and effectively to emerging threats to the security of the United States and its allies. The President has empowered the Secretary of State to coordinate and lead integrated U.S. government efforts to prepare, plan for, and conduct stabilization and reconstruction activities and to coordinate with the Secretary of Defense to harmonize civilian and military activities.

As of 2017, possibly earlier the United States no longer has a Civilian Response Corp.

Funding and size

Civilian Stabilization Initiative 

The  Civilian Stabilization Initiative (CSI) has been used in multiple countries since forming, including Afghanistan, Iraq, Haiti, Sudan, Kosovo, and Somalia. CSI was an answer for Congress’ call for the U.S. government to build its civilian capacity.

2010 

President Barack Obama's Fiscal Year 2010 budget, released on May 7, 2009 requested $323.3 million for the CSI to build U.S. civilian capacity for reconstruction and stabilization efforts.

The initiative would expand the current Civilian Response Corps and established a permanent U.S. government-wide civilian reconstruction and stabilization response capacity. The President’s budget request supports the recruitment, development, training, and equipping of the Civilian Response Corps.

2009 

President George W. Bush requested $248.6 million in Fiscal Year 2009 budget for the CSI, which includes the Civilian Response Corps.  The intent of CSI was to:

 Create 250 full-time positions for members of the Civilian Response Corps Active across the eight participating U.S. departments and agencies.  These “first responders” are experts who can deploy to a crisis with as little as 48 hours’ notice.
 Train 2,000 members of the Civilian Response Corps Standby in the same eight departments and agencies.  These are current federal employees who volunteer to undertake additional training and to be available to serve in stabilization missions in case of need. Standby members are deployable within 30 days for up to 180 days.
 Recruit and train 2,000 members of the Civilian Response Corps Reserve:  volunteers from the private sector and state and local governments who will bring additional skills and capabilities that do not exist in sufficient quantities in the federal government, such as police officers, city administrators, and health officials.

2008 

In the Supplemental Appropriations Act of 2008 United States Congress provided up to $75 million in initial funding for the active and standby components of the Civilian Response Corps.

1207 funding 

Section 1207 of the FY 2006 National Defense Authorization Act authorized the United States Secretary of Defense to transfer up to $100 million per year for two years to the Department of State for programs that support security, reconstruction or stabilization. In passing section 1207, United States Congress recognized the need previously expressed by the Bush administration for a civilian response capability for stabilization and reconstruction activities in countries that are prone to conflict. After funding $110 million in projects in FY06 and FY07, it was apparent that 1207 was a promising way to respond to stabilization and reconstruction needs. As a result, section 1207 was renewed for an additional $100 million in 2008.

FY 06 and FY 07 1207 projects 

 Lebanon: $10 million to support training for Lebanese Internal Security Forces and to assist Lebanese Armed Forces with recovering unexploded ordnance.
 Colombia: $4 million focused on capacity building, community organization, and supporting improved public outreach.
 Haiti: $20 million focused on volatile communities to create jobs, build infrastructure, and strengthen governance.
 Nepal: $10 million to improve public safety, promote rule of law, and promote quick development activities.
 Somalia Reconciliation and Stabilization Program Ethiopia, Kenya: $25 million to support security sector reform, promote capacity building, and mitigate conflict and instability.
 Trans-Saharan Counterterrorism Initiative Mali, Mauritania, Niger: $15 million to support teacher training, job skills training, and training local leaders.
 Tri-Border Initiative Indonesia, Malaysia, Philippines: $16.9 million to enhance infrastructure, economic development, and law enforcement activities.
 Yemen: $8.8 million to improve social services among youth, increase youth workforce opportunities and youth involvement.

Civil-military 

The 2009 Capstone Concept for Joint Operations (CCJO) reinforces the role of the military in reconstruction and stabilization by listing ‘relief and reconstruction’ as one of the four basic military activities. The Defense Department has identified the importance of integrated civilian and military environments as essential to stability operations and other government and non government agencies and organizations have identified the preference of civilians over military actors. Currently to coordinate reconstruction efforts between the military and civilian elements, the President signed into law National Security Presidential Directive 44 on December 7, 2005.

In National Security Presidential Directive – 44 (NSPD-44), the president stated the need to create a cohesive and permanent mechanism for the US government to address stabilization and reconstruction issues abroad. The Civilian Response Corps was created as a civilian interagency mechanism that would interface with the military to bring peace and stability to war torn countries. In this capacity the Secretaries of State and Defense integrate stabilization and reconstruction responsibilities to maintain clear accountability and to lead and support operations.

Composition 
The Civilian Response Corps was an interagency body that tried to promote “whole of government” planning and implementation of such missions with members in the Departments of State, Agriculture, Commerce, Health and Human Services, Homeland Security, Justice, and Treasury, as well as the U.S. Agency for International Development.

Participant were diplomats, development specialists, public health officials, law enforcement and corrections officers, engineers, economists, trade specialists, demographers, lawyers, public administrators, agronomists and others – to attempt restore "stability" and the rule of law, and achieve economic recovery and sustainable growth as quickly as possible.

Pilot program 

The U.S. Department of State's Office of the Coordinator for Reconstruction and Stabilization (S/CRS) coordinates the Civilian Response Corps and has developed pilot groups of Active and Standby members who have deployed to Sudan, Chad, Haiti, Lebanon, Kosovo, Iraq, and Afghanistan to assist with conflict prevention and mitigation.

The State Department coordinates with the Secretary of Defense to harmonize civilian and military activities.

References

External links
 Civilian Response Corps
 New State Department team to the rescue in disaster areas, war zones by Howard Lafranchi (Christian Science Monitor)
 U.S. Civilians Recruited To Help Troubled Nations by Jessica Wanke (NPR)
 Securing the Peace by Trevor Keck and Ann Vaughan (Foreign Policy in Focus)

United States Department of State